Wolffia brasiliensis is a species of flowering plant known by the common name Brazilian watermeal. It is native to North and South America, where it grows in mats on the surface of calm water bodies, such as ponds. It is a very tiny plant with no leaves, stems, or roots. The green part is up to 1.2 millimeters long with a flat surface with a bump in the center.

External links
Jepson Manual Treatment
Washington Burke Museum
Flora of North America

Lemnoideae
Flora of the Southeastern United States
Flora of South America
Flora of the Northeastern United States
Flora of Washington (state)
Flora of Oregon
Flora of California
Flora of Texas
Flora of the North-Central United States
Flora without expected TNC conservation status